Bolshoye Topolnoye, meaning "big poplar", is a lake in the southern part of the West Siberian Plain, Altai Krai, south-central Russia.

Its waters are slightly saline. There are no settlements by the lake. The nearest inhabited places are Petrovka and Mikhailovka. 

The water level of the lake is subject to variations. In snowy or rainy years, its surface area may reach , but in periods of drought the lake may dry up becoming covered with grass and residual swamps. Towards the end of the nineteenth century such an extremely dry period lasted for roughly ten years, until the inflowing waters of the Burla filled the lake up again.

Geography
Bolshoye Topolnoye is one of the largest lakes in Altai Krai. It has an oval shape and is located in the Kulunda Plain, Burlinsky District, at the northwestern end of the Krai. A small part of the northwestern shore belongs to the SW corner of Novosibirsk Oblast. Meanwhile, its southwestern shore is barely  to the east of the Russia/Kazakhstan border. The Burla river flows into the northeastern area of the lake. The shores of the lake are generally sloping, but there are as well marshy stretches.

Lake Bolshoy Azhbulat is located nearby in Kazakhstan,  to the west. In years of adequate rainfall the Burla river flows out of the Bolshoye Topolnoye lake from a channel in the southwestern area of the lakeshore and reaches the final stretch of its course ending in its mouth in lake Bolshoy Azhbulat. However, in dry years there is no outflow and the Burla river ends in lake Bolshoye Topolnoye.

Fauna
Among the fish species found in the waters of the lake rudd, whitefish, bream, pike, dace, perch, sterlet, roach, carp and common bleak are worth mentioning.

See also
List of lakes of Russia

References

External links
 
 Peculiarities of Macrozoobenthos in Lakes of Different Mineralization of the Southern Section of the Ob-Irtysh Interfluve

Lakes of Altai Krai
Lakes of Novosibirsk Oblast
Endorheic lakes of Asia
West Siberian Plain